A harmonised service of social value is a type of  freephone service available in the European Union and in some non-EU countries (including the countries in the European Economic Area and United Kingdom), which answers a specific social need, in particular which contributes to the well-being or safety of citizens, or particular groups of citizens, or helps citizens in difficulty. The phone numbers and the corresponding service descriptions are managed by the European Commission and harmonised across all EU and EEA member states. Harmonised services of social value use the prefix 116, which is then followed by three digits indicating the type of service.

After the commission has assigned a number, it is then up to the telephone regulator in each country to allocate the number to a telephone service provider and providing organisation of their choice. The first telephone numbers to be allocated are 116 000 (missing children helplines), 116 111 (child help lines) and 116 123 (emotional support helplines).

Assignments 
As of March 2010, the following numbers have been assigned by the European Commission:

The number 116 112 will not be used in order to avoid confusion with the single European emergency number 112. In addition, the number 116 116 is in use in Germany.

A reservation by the commission obligates member states to make the numbers available for registration by interested parties. However, the listing of a specific number and the associated harmonised service of social value does not carry an obligation for member states to ensure that the service in question is provided within their territory.

National implementations 
Each service is now available in at least part of the EU and the UK. The 116 117 medical assistance line is the least-widely implemented so far, having only been activated in Austria, Germany, and former EU-member Great Britain. By contrast, the 116 000 missing children line is active in 27 countries and the 116 111 child helpline is available in 22 countries.

In 2004, Germany's Regulatory Authority for Telecommunications and Postal Services (now the Federal Network Agency) awarded the number 116 116 to Sperr e.V., a non-profit organisation that would forward reports for lost credit and debit cards, SIM cards and key cards. This assignment predates the establishment of the commission's registry.

United Kingdom 

On 20 February 2009 the United Kingdom's telephone regulator Ofcom began its allocation process. Missing People were allocated the number 116 000; the NSPCC were assigned 116 111; and the Samaritans were allocated 116 123.

See also

References

External links 
 
 
 

Telephone numbers